The Equalizer 2 (sometimes promoted as The Equalizer II or EQ2) is a 2018 American vigilante action film directed by Antoine Fuqua. It is the sequel to the 2014 film The Equalizer, which was based on the TV series of the same name. The film stars Denzel Washington in the lead role, Pedro Pascal, Ashton Sanders, Melissa Leo, Bill Pullman, and Orson Bean in his final film role. It follows retired U.S. Marine and former DIA officer Robert McCall as he sets out on a path of revenge after one of his friends is murdered. The film is the fourth collaboration between Washington and Fuqua, following Training Day (2001), The Equalizer (2014), and The Magnificent Seven (2016).

Talks of an Equalizer sequel began seven months prior to the release of the first film. The project was officially announced in April 2015. Filming began in September 2017, and took place in Boston as well as other areas around Massachusetts. It also marks the first time Washington has starred in a sequel to one of his films.

The Equalizer 2 was released in the United States on July 20, 2018, by Sony Pictures Releasing. It received mixed reviews, with critics praising Washington's performance and the film's action sequences, but criticizing the pacing and number of subplots. Nevertheless, the film was a commercial success, grossing $190 million worldwide on a production budget of $62 million.

A sequel, titled The Equalizer 3, is scheduled to be released on September 1, 2023, with Washington to reprise his starring role and Fuqua returning to direct.

Plot 
Robert McCall still lives in Boston, where he works as a Lyft driver and assists the less fortunate with the help of his close friend and former DIA colleague Susan Plummer. Robert travels to Istanbul to retrieve the 9 year old daughter of a bookstore owner, Grace Braelick, who was kidnapped by her abusive Turkish father. He also helps Sam Rubinstein, an elderly Holocaust survivor looking for a painting of his sister who died in the Nazi death camps. 

Robert returns home to find that his apartment's courtyard has been vandalized. He accepts an offer from Miles Whittaker, a troubled teen resident with an artistic background, to paint a mural on the walls. Susan and DIA officer Dave York, Robert's former partner are called to investigate the murder-suicide of an agency affiliate and his wife in Brussels. At their hotel, Susan is accosted in her room and killed, presumably during a robbery. Robert determines that the expertly delivered fatal stab suggested that Susan was targeted and that the murder-suicide was staged, informing York of his findings. 

During one of his Lyft runs, Robert is attacked by an assassin posing as a passenger. Robert kills the man and retrieves his mobile phone, discovering York's number on the phone's call list. He confronts York at his home, and York admits that he became a mercenary after feeling used and discarded by the government and confesses that he killed Susan, as she would have figured out that he was behind the Brussels killings. Robert leaves the house where the rest of Robert's former squad and York's current teammates—Kovac, Ari, and Resnik—are waiting. Robert promises to kill the entire team before departing. 

Resnik and Ari head to Susan's house to kill her husband Brian, but Robert helps him escape. York and Kovac break into Robert's apartment, where Miles is painting the walls. Monitoring the apartment via webcams, Robert directs Miles to a secret passage, then calls York, who leaves the apartment with Kovac. Miles emerges from hiding, but is captured by York and Kovac as he exits the apartment. York deduces that Robert has gone to his seaside hometown, which has been evacuated as a hurricane approaches. Kovac, Ari, and Resnik begin searching the town in gale-force winds, while York situates himself on the town's watchtower. 

Robert kills the team one by one, dispatching Kovac with a speargun, Ari with knives, and Resnik in a flour explosion in Robert's wife's old bakery, set off by Resnik's own stun grenade. Now alone, York reveals that he has Miles tied up in the trunk of his car and begins shooting at it to lure Robert out. Robert confronts York atop the tower and kills him. Back in Boston, Susan's information about Sam's painting helps Robert reunite Sam with his long-lost sister. Miles finishes painting the mural on the apartment complex's brick wall, returns to school and focuses on his art. Having moved back into his old house, Robert looks out towards the calm sea.

Cast 

 Denzel Washington as Robert McCall
 Pedro Pascal as Dave York
 Ashton Sanders as Miles Whittaker
 Orson Bean as Sam Rubinstein
 Bill Pullman as Brian Plummer
 Melissa Leo as Susan Plummer
 Jonathan Scarfe as Resnik
 Sakina Jaffrey as Fatima
 Kazy Tauginas as Ari
 Garrett Golden as Kovac
 Tamara Hickey as Grace Braelick
 Rhys Cote as Grace's daughter
 Adam Karst as Grace's Turkish ex-husband
 Antoine de Lartigue as Mr. Calbert (Belgian Husband)
 Abigail Marlowe as Jana Calbert (Belgian Wife)
Andrei Arlovski as Russian mobster (Uncredited)

Production 
On February 24, 2014, seven months before the release of The Equalizer, it was announced that Sony Pictures and Escape Artists were planning a sequel, with Richard Wenk penning the script again. In early October 2014, Antoine Fuqua stated that there would be a sequel to the film only if audiences and Denzel Washington wanted it. He said it was an interesting character, and that the sequel could have more of an international flavor.

On April 22, 2015, Sony officially announced a sequel, with Washington returning to his role as vigilante Robert McCall. Fuqua's returning was not yet confirmed. In September 2016, producer Todd Black revealed that the script of the film was complete, and that Fuqua would return to direct, with shooting set to begin in September 2017.

On August 21, 2017, Pedro Pascal was cast in an unspecified role. Two days later, Melissa Leo and Bill Pullman were confirmed to reprise their roles from the first film, as Susan and Brian Plummer, and it was reported that the film would be produced by Jason Blumenthal, Black, Washington, Steve Tisch, Mace Neufeld, Alex Siskin and Tony Eldridge. On August 24, 2017, Ashton Sanders joined the film to play a character who comes to consider Washington's McCall a father figure. On March 25, 2018, it was revealed that Sakina Jaffrey had also been added to the cast.

Filming 
Principal photography on the film began in the South End area of Boston, Massachusetts, on September 14, 2017. Filming also took place on Lynn Shore Drive in Lynn, Massachusetts, the Powder Point Bridge in Duxbury, Massachusetts, as well as in Brant Rock, Massachusetts. The final action scene was filmed here. Interior scenes were filmed in a studio in Randolph, Massachusetts.

While Sony and other publications reported the film was made on a net production budget of $62 million, Deadline Hollywood stated their sources insisted the cost was "in the high [$70 million]" range after Massachusetts tax credits.

Release 
The Equalizer 2 was released on July 20, 2018, by Sony Pictures. Sony had originally scheduled the film for a September 29, 2017, release, but on November 3, 2016, the film got pushed to September 14, 2018, and then on September 28, 2017, the release date brought it forward to August 3, 2018, but then on February 13, 2018, it got settled on its July 20, 2018 release.

Reception

Box office
The Equalizer 2 grossed $102.1 million in the United States and Canada, and $88.3 million in other territories, for a total worldwide gross of $190.4 million, against a production budget of $62 million.

In the United States and Canada, The Equalizer 2 was released alongside 2 other sequels, Mamma Mia! Here We Go Again and Unfriended: Dark Web, and was projected to gross $27–32 million from 3,388 theaters in its opening weekend. It made $3.1 million from Thursday night previews, double the $1.45 million earned by the original film in 2014, and $13.5 million on its first day. It went on to debut to $35.8 million, finishing first at the box office. It also bested the opening of the first film ($34.1 million) and was the third-best domestic start for Washington. It fell 61% to $14 million in its second weekend, finishing third behind newcomer Mission: Impossible – Fallout and Mamma Mia!, and in its third weekend the film grossed $8.8 million, dropping to fifth place.

Critical response
The website's critical consensus reads: "The Equalizer 2 delivers the visceral charge of a standard vigilante thriller, but this reunion of trusted talents ultimately proves a disappointing case study in diminishing returns." On Metacritic, the film has a weighted average score of 50 out of 100, based on 43 critics, indicating "mixed or average reviews". Audiences polled by PostTrak gave the film an 86% overall positive score and a 69% "definite recommend", while CinemaScore reported filmgoers gave it an average grade of "A" on an A+ to F scale, up from the first film's "A−".

David Ehrlich of IndieWire gave the film a "C−", saying: "The good news is that fans of Antoine Fuqua's The Equalizer—a bland and pulpy 2014 riff on the '80s TV series of the same name—are in for more of the same. The bad news is the rest of us are too."

Sequel

In August 2018, Fuqua announced his plans to continue the film series, expressing interest in the plot taking place in an international setting.

By January 2022, a third Equalizer film was confirmed to be in development, with Washington to return in the titular role. Fuqua is slated to direct the film. Principal photography was scheduled to commence sometime in 2022, with Washington announcing that the film would be the next he makes.

In April 2022, Sony confirmed that the film was set to be released on September 1, 2023. Filming began in October 2022 on the Amalfi Coast in Italy.

Television series

In November 2019, a television series adaptation was announced to be in development with Queen Latifah cast in lead role as Robyn McCall. Andrew Marlowe and Terri Miller were announced as co-showrunners/executive producers, with Latifah also serving as an additional executive producer. In January 2021, when asked about the show's connection to the Equalizer film series, Marlowe stated that while the television series is intended to stand on its own, the opportunity is being left open for a future crossover between the show and the films.

References

External links 
 
 

2018 action thriller films
2018 crime thriller films
American action thriller films
American crime thriller films
American films about revenge
American sequel films
Columbia Pictures films
Escape Artists films
Films about the Central Intelligence Agency
Films about hurricanes
Films based on television series
Films directed by Antoine Fuqua
Films produced by Antoine Fuqua
Films produced by Mace Neufeld
Films produced by Denzel Washington
Films scored by Harry Gregson-Williams
Films set in 2018
Films set in apartment buildings
Films set in Brussels
Films set in Boston
Films set in Turkey
Films set in Washington, D.C.
Films shot in Boston
Films shot in Massachusetts
Films with screenplays by Richard Wenk
American vigilante films
The Equalizer
2010s English-language films
2010s American films
2010s vigilante films